Jonas Ahlstrand (born 16 February 1990) is a Swedish former professional cyclist, who rode professionally between 2013 and 2016 for the  and  teams.

Ahlstrand's first professional-level victory came while he was still racing for a UCI Continental team at the 2012 Tour of Norway.

Major results

2007
 3rd Time trial, National Junior Road Championships
 10th Time trial, UEC European Junior Road Championships
2008
 National Junior Road Championships
1st  Road race
3rd Time trial
2010
 1st Univest Grand Prix
2011
 2nd Tallinn–Tartu GP
 2nd Kernen Omloop Echt-Susteren
2012
 1st Scandinavian Race Uppsala
 1st Stage 1 Tour of Norway
 3rd La Côte Picarde
 7th Ronde Van Vlaanderen Beloften
2014
 1st Stage 2 Circuit de la Sarthe
 1st Stage 2 Tour of Alberta
2015
 1st Stage 2 Four Days of Dunkirk
 1st Stage 4 Tour de l'Eurométropole
 6th Velothon Stockholm
2017
 2nd Kalmar Grand Prix
 10th Himmerland Rundt

References

External links

1990 births
Living people
Swedish male cyclists
Place of birth missing (living people)
20th-century Swedish people
21st-century Swedish people